Sir Ilay Campbell, 1st Baronet, Lord Succoth,  (1734–1823) was a Scottish advocate, judge and politician.
He rose to be Lord President of the Court of Session.

Life

Campbell's birthplace is given as either Argyll or Edinburgh. His mother was Helen Wallace, and his father, Archibald Campbell of Succoth, Principal Clerk of Session to the Scottish Courts.

He attended Mundell's School in Edinburgh and then the University of Glasgow to study law, graduating in 1751.

An advocate from 1757, he was engaged in the Douglas peerage case from 1764 to 1769. He was appointed Solicitor General for Scotland in 1783 and Lord Advocate in 1784. He became Member of Parliament for Glasgow Burghs in the same year. He was Lord President of the Court of Session and Lord Justice General from 1789 to 1808, where he sat as Lord Succoth.

On his resignation in 1808, he was created a baronet, and resided at Garscube House, about four miles from Glasgow on the banks of the river Kelvin. There he engaged in the management of his estate, and the performance of his duties as a country gentleman. Lord Cockburn says of him that "he lived like a patriarch in a house overflowing with company, beloved by troops of relations, and courted for his character and hospitality by many friends."

Campbell was awarded an honorary doctorate (LLD) from the University of Glasgow in 1784, and elected Lord Rector of the university in 1799. He died at Garscube in 1823 aged 89.

Campbell was succeeded by his son Archibald, also a Senator of the College of Justice under the same title of Lord Succoth.

It is worth observing that the title "Lord Succoth" derived from the 1st and 2nd baronets' status as law lords rather than as Lords of Parliament.  As such, the title "Lord Succoth" was not hereditable. The honorific "The Much Honoured" references a feudal barony ("of Succoth"). Sir Ilay's descendants remained baronets until the extinction of the baronetcy in 2017.

Family

Campbell married Susan Mary Murray of Murrayfield, sister of Alexander Murray, Lord Henderland in 1766. She lived until 1815.

Their daughter, Margaret Campbell, married Sir John Connell, Judge of the Admiralty Court, and their son, Arthur Connell FRSE (Campbell's grandson) was a chemist who discovered connellite.

Their daughter Elizabeth Campbell (d.1853) married William Dalziell Colquhoun. Their daughter Mary Frances Campbell died in 1870 without marrying. These two sisters are buried in Dean Cemetery.

Their daughter Susan married Crauford Tait WS of Harvieston and they were parents to Archibald Campbell Tait who became Archbishop of Canterbury.

Positions of note

 Founder member of the Royal Society of Edinburgh (1783)
 Director of the Highland Society (1784)
 Trustee for the University of Edinburgh and South Bridge

References

1734 births
1823 deaths
Succoth
Baronets in the Baronetage of the United Kingdom
Members of the Parliament of Great Britain for Scottish constituencies
Rectors of the University of Glasgow
Lords President of the Court of Session
People educated at James Mundell's School
Scottish knights
Alumni of the University of Glasgow
Founder Fellows of the Royal Society of Edinburgh
18th-century Scottish judges
19th-century Scottish judges
Members of the Faculty of Advocates
Solicitors General for Scotland
Lord Advocates
Politics of Glasgow
British MPs 1784–1790
People from Bearsden